The 2019 Patriot League men's basketball tournament was the postseason tournament for the Patriot League during the 2018–19 NCAA Division I men's basketball season. It was held on March 5, 7, 10, and 13, with the higher seed in each match up hosting at their respective campus sites. No. 1 seed Colgate defeated Bucknell 94–80 in the championship game to win the conference tournament championship, and the conference's automatic bid to the 2019 NCAA tournament. It was Colgate's first Patriot League tournament championship since 1996, and third overall.

Seeds
All 10 Patriot League teams were eligible for the tournament. The top six teams received a first round bye. Teams were seeded by record within the conference, with a tiebreaker system to seed teams with identical conference records.

Schedule

Bracket

References

Patriot League men's basketball tournament
Tournament
Patriot League men's basketball tournament